Samuel Shone ( 1820 – 1901) was Bishop of Kilmore, Elphin and Ardagh from  1884  to 1897. Educated at Trinity College, Dublin, he was ordained in 1843 and his first post was a curacy on Rathlin Island. After this he was Curate of St. John's, Sligo and later of Calry, Sligo, before becoming Vicar of Cavan in 1866. He was appointed Archdeacon of Kilmore in 1878,  before elevation to the episcopate  in 1884 as the 7th bishop of the United Diocese. In consequence of failing health he resigned the bishopric in 1897 and retired from the active ministry.

Shone died in October 1901.

Notes

1820 births
Alumni of Trinity College Dublin
Archdeacons of Kilmore
19th-century Anglican bishops in Ireland
Bishops of Kilmore, Elphin and Ardagh
1901 deaths